Combat Logistics Regiment 4 (CLR-4) is a regiment of the United States Marine Corps Reserve. It was activated on September 8, 2013 in Kansas City, Missouri.

Organization

 Headquarters Company, Kansas City, MO.
 Combat Logistics Battalion 23, Fort Lewis, WA.
 Combat Logistics Battalion 453, Aurora, CO.
 Chemical Biological Radiological Nuclear (CBRN) Defense Platoon, Kansas City, MO.

History

From its inception as a Logistics Regiment, CLR-4 has been at the forefront of integration of Reserve Marines with active duty Marines.  In August 2014, a detachment of CLR-4 Marines went to South Korea in support of Ulchi Freedom Guardian; in subsequent years, the Regiment has supported various Korean Theater of Operations exercises.  In February 2015, CLR-4 took part in an active component Marine Expeditionary Force Level Exercise.  In April 2016, CLR-4 provided the headquarters element for Combined Joint Task Force African Lion in the Kingdom of Morocco.  In June 2017, the Regimental Headquarters conducted a battle simulation scenario-based event involving the Commanding Officer and staff in Fort McCoy, Wisconsin.

Past commanders 
 Colonel Daniel H. Coleman (2020-2022)
 Colonel Robert T. Meade (2018-2020)
 Colonel Thomas M. Fahy (2016-2018)
 Colonel Joseph N. Raftery (2014-2016)
 Colonel Charles L. Sides (2013-2014) (previously 24th Marine Regiment Commander and oversaw unit transition)

References

External links
 Official website

Combat logistics regiments of the United States Marine Corps
Military units and formations established in 2013